C. carnea may refer to:

 Caladenia carnea, a terrestrial orchid
 Calocybe carnea, a pink-capped mushroom
 Canna carnea, a garden plant
 Chromodoris carnea, a sea slug
 Chrysoperla carnea, a common lacewing
 Columbella carnea, a sea snail
 Conferva carnea, a red algae
 Corynactis carnea, a colonial anthozoan
 Cypraea carnea, a sea snail